American singer Hilary Duff has released five studio albums, two extended plays (EPs), one live album, four compilation albums, five video albums, 21 singles, four promotional singles, and 16 music videos. Duff released her debut studio album Santa Claus Lane on Buena Vista Records in October 2002. The holiday album peaked at the 154th position on the Billboard 200 in the United States, and was certified gold by the Recording Industry Association of America.

In 2003, her second studio album Metamorphosis was released by Buena Vista and Hollywood Records. The album, referred to as Duff's "first proper studio album", topped the American and Canadian charts and sold five million copies worldwide. It spawned the hit singles "So Yesterday" and "Come Clean". The album has also been the breakthrough release for Hollywood Records, being the first album in the label's history to earn that much success.

Duff's third studio album, the self-titled Hilary Duff, was released in 2004 and peaked at the second position on the Billboard 200 while topping the Canadian Albums Chart. The album spawned the worldwide single "Fly" and was also promoted with an Australian-only single; "Someone's Watching Over Me". In 2005, she released her first compilation album, Most Wanted, which became her first album to debut at number one on the Billboard 200. The album spawned the singles "Wake Up" and "Beat of My Heart", which both peaked in the top ten in Italy. The following year, Duff released 4ever Hilary Duff, an Italy-exclusive compilation.

Duff's fourth studio album, Dignity, was released in 2007 and reached the top ten in the US, Canada and Italy. The lead single "Play with Fire" failed to make an impact on national charts, though it did begin a string of American club hits for Duff, peaking at the 31st position on Billboard'''s Hot Dance Club Songs chart. The second single "With Love" became her highest-peaking single on the Billboard Hot 100, peaking at number 24, while also reaching number one on the club charts along with the album's final single "Stranger". She scored her third consecutive number-one club hit with "Reach Out", the lead single from her first greatest hits release Best of Hilary Duff (2008). The album peaked at number 125 on the Billboard 200. As of July 2014, Duff has sold over 15 million records worldwide.

On June 16, 2015, Duff released her fifth studio album Breathe In. Breathe Out., which debuted in the top five in the U.S, Canada and Australia. It spawned three singles which were "Chasing the Sun", "All About You", and "Sparks". "Chasing the Sun" was the highest peaking single from the album on the Billboard Hot 100 where it charted at number 79, whereas second single "All About You" was certified Gold in Australia. "Sparks", the final single from Breathe In. Breathe Out.'' continued Duff's streak of top ten hits on the dance charts when it peaked at number 6 and was certified Gold in Mexico.

Albums

Studio albums

Compilation albums

Live albums

Video albums

Extended plays

Singles

As lead artist

As featured artist

Promotional singles

Other album appearances

Music videos

Notes

References

General

Specific

External links
Official discography of Hilary Duff
[ Discography of Hilary Duff] at Allmusic

Duff, Hilary
Discography
Duff, Hilary